Ménage à Trois is a song performed by Swedish band Alcazar. The song is the second single from their second album, Alcazarized, and it was set to be the first released internationally.

Music video
A music video was produced to promote the single.

Formats and track listings
These are the formats and track listings of promotional single releases of "Ménage à Trois".

CD single
"Radio Edit" - 3:51
"The Mute8 Mix" - 6:09
"J Pipe Smooth Club" - 5:44
"Now in Stereo Edit" - 7:17
"Fls Darkroom Remix" - 7:43

Chart performance

External links
Ménage à Trois YouTube Video

References

Alcazar (band) songs
Eurodance songs
2003 singles
RCA Records singles
Songs written by Lindy Robbins
2003 songs